Ají panca, Peruvian red pepper, is a variety of Capsicum baccatum (a chili pepper) grown in Peru and used in Peruvian cuisine. It has thick flesh and fruity overtones, it turns deep red to burgundy when ripe. It is commonly sun-dried at the farms and sold dry. It is very mild and if deseeded and deveined is considered to have no heat but is instead used for its flavor and color.

References

Capsicum cultivars
Peruvian cuisine